Charles Martin Wright (born 26 October 1988) is a British speedway rider.

Career history 
Wright was born in Stockport, Greater Manchester, started his career with the Buxton Hitmen in the Conference League before stepping up a level and joining the Workington Comets for the 2008 season.

In 2011, he had a spell on loan at Leicester Lions, replacing Jamie Courtney, only to be replaced himself later in the season. In 2012, he rode for Edinburgh Monarchs until being released in July. Shortly after he went on to join the Glasgow Tigers only a few weeks after his axe from Edinburgh replacing long serving reserve Jayden O'Malley and simultaneously joined the Buxton Hitmen in the National League at number one. In late August 2013, he replaced Stefan Nielsen in the Somerset Rebels side, and made an immediate impact when scoring 9-points in the 2nd leg of the KO Cup Semi-final at Edinburgh, which ended in a 90-90 aggregate draw and had to be ridden again the following month when the Rebels eventually carried off the Cup. He went to become a major contributor to the Rebels title and KO Cup winning efforts. In 2014, he was one of only two riders retained from the Rebels double winning septet, with the other being Nick Morris. He continued his 2015 season with the Somerset Rebels again.  In December 2016, he signed for Redcar Bears in the new British SGB Championship for the 2017 season. For 2018, he moved to local track Sheffield Tigers but returned to Redcar Bears again in 2019. 

Charles was crowned British Champion for the first time in his career after winning the British Final at the National Speedway Stadium in Manchester on 29 July. He appeared as Wildcard in the British Grand Prix in Cardiff on 21 September 2019 scoring 5 points. On 23 October 2019 Charles was awarded his first Great Britain cap when he represented Team Great Britain in the new Global Challenge series against Denmark scoring 10 points as joint top scorer. Four days later Charles became the first Captain of the Redcar Bears to lift the SGB Championship Knock-Out Cup after defeating local rival Newcastle in the final. Charles competed in the inaugural 2019 FIM Oceania Speedway Championship in Gillman South Australia finishing sixth with 11 points.

In 2021 and 2022, Wright rode for the Belle Vue Aces in the SGB Premiership and the Redcar Bears in the SGB Championship. In 2021, he won the bronze medal in the 2021 British Speedway Championship and won the 2022 SGB Championship Pairs Championship for Redcar, with Lewis Kerr. His 2022 season produced further success when he won the SGB Premiership 2022 with his team Belle Vue.

In 2023, re-signed for Belle Vue for the SGB Premiership 2023and Redcar Bears for the SGB Championship 2023.

Family
His grandfather, Jim Yacoby rode for the Belle Vue Aces from 1959 until 1967. Charles' brother James is also a speedway rider. He was British Speedway Champion in 2019.

References 

1988 births
Living people
British speedway riders
English motorcycle racers
Sportspeople from Stockport
Belle Vue Aces riders
Buxton Hitmen riders
Edinburgh Monarchs riders
Glasgow Tigers riders
Leicester Lions riders
Peterborough Panthers riders
Redcar Bears riders
Sheffield Tigers riders
Somerset Rebels riders
Swindon Robins riders
Workington Comets riders